Vernon G. Smith (born April 11, 1944) is a Democratic member of the Indiana House of Representatives, representing the 14th District since 1990. He was the chair of the Indiana Black Legislative Caucus from 2006 to 2008.

Smith is a Baptist.

References

External links
Indiana State Legislature – Representative Vernon G. Smith Official government website
Project Vote Smart – Representative Vernon G. Smith (IN) profile
Follow the Money – Vernon G Smith
2006 2004 2002 2000 1998 1996 1994 campaign contributions

Democratic Party members of the Indiana House of Representatives
1944 births
Living people
Politicians from Gary, Indiana
Baptists from Indiana
African-American state legislators in Indiana
Educators from Indiana
21st-century American politicians
Indiana University alumni
21st-century African-American politicians
20th-century African-American people